Zeenat is a 1991 Pakistani television series written by Fatima Surayya Bajia based on the novel Zeenat which was written by Mirza Kalich Beg and directed by Mohammad Baksh Sumejo.

Synopsis 
The story is about a sindhi girl name Zeenat who loves studying but she is pressurized by her mother to marry someone and soon she marries a older man against her elder brother wishes.

Cast 
 Rabia Noreen as Zeenat
 Ishrat Hashmi as Shehar Bano
 Mehmood Siddiqui as Ali Raza
 Zaheen Tahira as Bibi Jan
 Sultana Zafar as Sara
 Gulab Chandio as Ramzan
 Shafi Muhammad Shah as Allah Dad
 Subhani Ba Yunus as Ali Nawaz
 Ubaida Ansari as Zeenat's Amma
 Tasneem Rana as Bakhtawar
 Master Hamza Hamid as Zeenat's Son
 Khalid Zaman as Hamid
 Manzoor Murad as Ehsanullah
 Nasreen Naz as Sakeena
 Seema Hasan as Subhai
 Bachal Shah as Major Young
 Farooq Memon as Hoat
 Abdul Aleem Sheikh as Rahgeer
 Israr Alam Siddiqui as Doctor
 Mehmood Ali as Molvi Siddiqui
 Wakeel Farooqi as Wali Muhammad Saen
 Noor Muhammad Lashari as Lakhmeer
 Fareed Nawaz Baloch as Haibat Khan
 Mumtaz Kanwal as Saeeda
 Rehana Akhtar as Kulsoom

References

External links 
 

1990s Pakistani television series
Pakistani television dramas based on novels
Pakistan Television Corporation original programming
Pakistani drama television series
Urdu-language television shows